Daniel Micallef (8 June 1928 – 9 December 2022) was a Maltese diplomat and politician. He served as Speaker of the House of Representatives from 1982 to 1986 and was a representative of Malta at the Parliamentary Assembly of the Council of Europe from 1985 to 1986.

Micallef died on 9 December 2022, at the age of 94.

References

1928 births
2022 deaths
20th-century Maltese politicians
Maltese diplomats
Labour Party (Malta) politicians
Members of the House of Representatives of Malta
Members of the Parliamentary Assembly of the Council of Europe
People from Rabat, Malta